Tough Love:  My Story of the Things Worth Fighting For is a 2019 nonfiction book published by Simon & Schuster by  Susan Rice, who had served as United States Ambassador to the United Nations and as National Security Adviser under President Barack Obama.

Reception
The review in The New York Times described Rice's "retelling of the foreign policy decisions of the Clinton and Obama administrations" as "clinical." The Times described how Rice had become a "lightning rod of partisan hatred" as she suffered the fallout for the Benghazi affair. Rice writes that she is most comfortable in the "policy-focused, behind-the-scenes roles" but was thrust into the limelight as a major player in Benghazi.

NPR called her memoir "candid" and said that she told her personal story with honesty.

Publishers Weekly called the book a "stellar debut memoir" of Rice's "public service career".

Publication

References

External links
Publisher website:   

2019 non-fiction books
Simon & Schuster books
American non-fiction books